Iligan City East National High School (formerly Regional Science High School), popularly known as ICENHS,  is a public high school located in Brgy. Sta. Filomena, Iligan City. It was established in 1985.

Curricula

Science, Technology, Engineering, and Mathematics
A curriculum based on the idea of educating students in four specific disciplines — science, technology, engineering and mathematics — in an interdisciplinary and applied approach.

Special Program in the Arts
A nationwide program for students with potentials or talents in the Arts. One pilot school in every region was selected to pilot and implement this program and is now on its tenth year of implementation.

Performing arts
 Theater Arts
 Dance
 Music

Non-performing Arts
 Media Arts
 Creative Writing
 Visual Arts

Basic Education Curriculum
A form of tool which will stand as one point of learning areas as adequate for the development of competencies starting from Basic education up to the second level of which is renounced as High School.

Student life
The main student organization Supreme Student Government, the foremost co-curricular student organization authorized to operate and implement pertinent programs, projects and activities in schools.

Attached Agency
 National Museum of the Philippines

References 

High schools in the Philippines
Schools in Iligan